Mizinga Anthony Mwinga (born 3 January 1980) is a Zambian actor.

Biography
Mwinga was born in Zambia, the son of Dave and Carole Mwinga. His father is an engineer. Mwinga's brother, Stephen, works as a model, while his sister, Alice, is a cook. Mwinga attended elementary school in the Montreal neighborhoods of Pierrefonds and Pointe-Claire. As he had relatives there, he moved to England before high school. In college, Mwinga took his first acting class on his mother's advice, and he immediately loved it.

Mwinga had several small roles in theater, films, and television. He had a role in London's West End production of the play Sweet Charity. In 2012, Mwinga had his first big role in a film, as the rebel leader Grand Tigre Royal in Kim Nguyen's War Witch. The film deals with child soldiers in sub-Saharan Africa, and Mwinga's character believes that Komona (Rachel Mwanza) in a sorceress. In order to play the role, Mwinga had to learn to speak the Lingala language, taking months of practice. As he had to handle automatic weapons, Mwinga and the cast had to be escorted by a military convoy while in the Democratic Republic of the Congo due to unwanted attention from local criminals. War Witch received several awards and was nominated for an Academy Award for Best Foreign Film. In 2013, Mwinga had a small part in White House Down. He starred in Darren Aronofsky's 2017 film Mother!.

Mwinga lives in Montreal and volunteers at the local YMCA.

Filmography

Television

Films

References

External links
Mizinga Mwinda at the Internet Movie Database.

1980 births
Living people
Zambian male actors
People from Lusaka
Black Canadian male actors